Better Noise Music is the rebranded and re-organized record label founded in 2006 by Allen Kovac, CEO of 10th Street Entertainment. The label was previously known as Eleven Seven Label Group with Eleven Seven, Five Seven and Better Noise Records as imprints. They are an artist development label, developing new bands in the rock music genre. The label recently announced an expanded alliance with FUGA and was named 2019 Active Rock Label of the Year for the second consecutive year.  In early 2020, Kovac launched sister company, Better Noise Films.

Roster

Current 

 All Good Things
 As Lions
 Asking Alexandria
 Atlas Genius
 Awolnation
 Bad Wolves
 Bleeker
 Cory Marks
 Crossbone Skully
 Deuce
 Dirty Heads
 Eva Under Fire
 Fire from the Gods
 Five Finger Death Punch
 The Funeral Portrait
 From Ashes to New
 Hellyeah
 The Hu
 Hyro the Hero
 Nevrlands
 Nothing More
 Rews (Marshall Records distribution deal)
 Sixx:A.M.
 Tempt
 Danny Worsnop

Former 
 Anavae
 Apocalyptica
 Art of Dying
 Attica Riots
 Bang Bang Romeo
 Buckcherry
 Charm City Devils
 Diamante
 Escape the Fate
 The Exies
 Hellyeah
 In Flames
 Marion Raven 
 Mötley Crüe (as the distributor of Mötley Records)
 My Secret Circus
 Papa Roach
 Pop Evil
 Press to MECO (Marshall Records distribution)
 Rews (Marshall Records distribution)
 Romes
 Tommy Vext
 Trapt

References

External links

American record labels
Alternative rock record labels
Rock record labels